Vinod Viplav (Hindi विनोद विप्लव) (Born 5 November 1963) is an Indian author who writes in Hindi. He wrote books on subjects ranging across film, literature, science and health.

Bibliography 
Meri Awaz Suno is the first biography of Mohammad Rafi, written by Vinod Viplav. This book contains rare information and pictures of the life and the song of Mohammad Rafi. He is also editor and publisher of a monthly health magazine, Health Spectrum. Vibhav da ka Angootha was first collection of Stories by Vinod Viplav, which was published with financial help from Hindi Academy of Delhi government.

He worked in United News of India.

Books and publications 
 Meri Awaz Suno – Biography of Mohammed Rafi in Hindi
 The World of Rafi – Collection of Articles on Mohammed Rafi
 Hindi Cinema Ke 150 Sitare
Manasik Rog : Karan Aur Bachav

References

Living people
Hindi-language writers
1963 births